Fyodor Aleksandrovich Bredikhin (8 December 1831 – 14 May 1904 (O.S.: 1 May)) was a Russian astronomer.  His surname is sometimes given as Bredichin in the literature, and non-Russian sources sometimes render his first name as Theodor.

Information

In 1857 he joined the staff of the observatory at Moscow University, becoming its director in 1873.   In 1890 he became director of Pulkovo Observatory (until 1894) and in the same year became a member of the Russian Academy of Sciences.

He studied the theory of comet tails, and also studied meteors and meteor showers.

The asteroid 786 Bredichina and the crater Bredikhin on the Moon are named after him. The  is awarded by the Russian Academy of Sciences.

References

Bibliography

External links

 Obituary AN 165 (1904) 351/352 (in German)
 Obituary MNRAS 65 (1905) 348

1831 births
1904 deaths
Astronomers from the Russian Empire
Full members of the Saint Petersburg Academy of Sciences
19th-century astronomers
Imperial Moscow University alumni